Periphyllus is a genus of maple aphids in the family Aphididae. There are more than 40 described species in Periphyllus.

Species
These 48 species belong to the genus Periphyllus:

 Periphyllus acericola (Walker, 1848)
 Periphyllus acerifoliae
 Periphyllus acerihabitans Zhang, 1982
 Periphyllus aceriphaga Chakrabarti & Mandal, 1987
 Periphyllus aceris (Linnaeus, 1761)
 Periphyllus aesculi Hille Ris Lambers, 1933
 Periphyllus allogenes
 Periphyllus americanus (Baker, 1917)
 Periphyllus bengalensis Ghosh & Raychaudhuri, 1972
 Periphyllus brevisetosus Sorin, 1990
 Periphyllus brevispinosus Gillette & Palmer, 1930
 Periphyllus bulgaricus Tashev, 1964
 Periphyllus caesium Chakrabarti & Saha, 1987
 Periphyllus californiensis (Shinji, 1917)
 Periphyllus changlai Remaudière, 2002
 Periphyllus coleoptis
 Periphyllus coracinus (Koch, 1854)
 Periphyllus diacerivorus Zhang, 1982
 Periphyllus formosanus Takahashi, 1921
 Periphyllus garhwalensis Chakrabarti & Mandal, 1987
 Periphyllus himalayensis
 Periphyllus hirticornis (Walker, 1848)
 Periphyllus hokkaidensis Sorin, 1990
 Periphyllus karatavicus Kadyrbekov, 1999
 Periphyllus koelreuteriae (Takahashi, 1919)
 Periphyllus kuwanaii (Takahashi, 1919)
 Periphyllus loricatus Pashtshenko, 1987
 Periphyllus lyropictus (Kessler, 1886) (Norway maple aphid)
 Periphyllus mamontovae Narzikulov, 1957
 Periphyllus mandshuricus
 Periphyllus minutus Shaposhnikov, 1952
 Periphyllus negundinis (Thomas, 1878) (boxelder aphid)
 Periphyllus nevskyii
 Periphyllus obscurus Mamontova, 1955
 Periphyllus pakistanicus Remaudière, 2002
 Periphyllus pallidus Chakrabarti & Saha, 1987
 Periphyllus rhenanus (Börner, 1940)
 Periphyllus singeri (Börner, 1952)
 Periphyllus steveni Mamontova-Solukha, 1962
 Periphyllus tegmentosus
 Periphyllus testudinaceus (Fernie, 1852) (common maple aphid)
 Periphyllus tokyoensis Sorin, 1990
 Periphyllus triflorumi
 Periphyllus unmoonsanensis
 Periphyllus vandenboschi Hille Ris Lambers, 1966
 Periphyllus venetianus Hille Ris Lambers, 1967
 Periphyllus villosii Chakrabarti, 1977
 Periphyllus viridis (Matsumura, 1919)

References

Further reading

External links

 

Sternorrhyncha genera
Chaitophorinae